Richland Township is one of fourteen townships in Miami County, Indiana, United States. As of the 2010 census, its population was 1,179 and it contained 480 housing units.

History
Richland Township was organized in 1837. The township was so named on account of their fertile soil.

The Eikenberry Bridge was listed on the National Register of Historic Places in 2006.

Geography

Unincorporated towns
 Chili at 
 Pettysville at

Extinct towns
 Anson
 Paw Paw
 Wooleytown

Cemeteries
The township contains these four cemeteries: Finley, Macedonia, Musselman and Yike.

Airports and landing strips
 Rush Strip Airport

School districts
 North Miami Community Schools

Political districts
 Indiana's 5th congressional district
 State House District 23
 State Senate District 18

References
 
 United States Census Bureau 2008 TIGER/Line Shapefiles
 IndianaMap

External links
 Indiana Township Association
 United Township Association of Indiana
 City-Data.com page for Richland Township

Townships in Miami County, Indiana
Townships in Indiana